Göktepe can refer to:

 Göktepe
 Göktepe, Akçakoca
 Göktepe, Balya
 Göktepe, Biga
 Göktepe, Çermik
 Göktepe, Çınar
 Göktepe, Karayazı
 Göktepe, Orhaneli
 Göktepe, Şanlıurfa